Nyanga–Buyi are a pair of Bantu languages left after the languages of Zone D.40–50 in Guthrie's classification were reclassified. According to Nurse & Philippson (2003), they form a valid node.
Nyanga, Buyi

References